Avinash Arun is an Indian cinematographer and film director.

As a cinematographer he has shot Hindi films such as Drishyam, Madaari, and Hichki.

His first directorial Marathi film Killa was awarded a Crystal Bear by the children's jury at 64th Berlin International Film Festival. The film was also awarded best feature film in Marathi at 62nd National Film Awards.

Early life
Avinash Arun is a cinematography graduate from FTII Pune.

Career
In 2013 Avinash worked as a cinematographer in short film That Day After Every Day. He has also worked as a director of cinematography in 2015 film Masaan. He is working as a cinematographer in Manish Mundra's untitled film. Avinash directed Paatal Lok, a web series produced by Anushka Sharma in year 2020.

Filmography

References 

Year of birth missing (living people)
Living people
Indian cinematographers
21st-century Indian film directors
People from Mumbai